Georg "Schorsch" Knöpfle (15 May 1904 – 14 December 1987) was a German football player and coach. As a player, he received 23 international caps and was part of the German squad at the 1928 Summer Olympics.

Honours
 Bundesliga champion: 1964.
 Bundesliga runner-up: 1965.
 German Cup winner: 1961.

References

External links
 
 

1904 births
1987 deaths
People from Schramberg
Sportspeople from Freiburg (region)
German footballers
Germany international footballers
German football managers
Bundesliga managers
Olympic footballers of Germany
Footballers at the 1928 Summer Olympics
Association football defenders
SpVgg Greuther Fürth players
FSV Frankfurt players
Eintracht Braunschweig managers
Hamburger SV managers
FC Bayern Munich managers
Alemannia Aachen managers
SV Werder Bremen managers
1. FC Köln managers
Footballers from Baden-Württemberg